WikiBaseball is a Taiwanese baseball website. It was created on April 14, 2005. Its major contents are people, event, time, place, and merchandise of Taiwanese baseball.

Wikibaseball runs on MediaWiki software. It is written collaboratively by volunteers. Besides feature story, all content is available under CC-BY-NC.

Because many people browse this website. United Daily News, Formosa Television and some Taiwan media introduce this website to Taiwanese people in March 2006. After several month, Wikibaseball teamed up with Chinese Taipei Baseball Association to digitize their relic. In addition, two Wikibaseball contributors contributed to Liberty Times and interviewed by Uonline reporter in March 2007.

See also 
 List of wikis
 Open content
 User-generated content
 Chinese Taipei Baseball Association

References

External links 
 Official Website — Wikibaseball 
 Forum — Ptt 

Wiki communities
MediaWiki websites
Baseball culture
Baseball websites
Baseball in Taiwan
Internet properties established in 2005